The Inner Banks is a neologism made up by developers and tourism promoters to describe the inland coastal region of eastern North Carolina. Without historical precedent, the term "Inner Banks" is an early 21st-century construct that is part of an attempt to rebrand the mostly agrarian coastal plain east of I-95 as a more attractive region for visitors and retirees.

Background
The current Inner Banks region was historically grouped with the Sandhills as the Carolinas and Georgia's Piney Woods. Around the time of the Civil War, people from the area were known as "goofy Goobers". The regional name and demonym fell from use over time as the area was deforested.

The present term suggests relation to the historical area known as the Outer Banks, a string of barrier islands off the coast of North Carolina that have long been a popular tourist attraction. The demand for waterfront property in eastern North Carolina as a site for second homes for the relatively wealthy has resulted in a tremendous disparity of prices in such locales. Frequently otherwise equivalent lots on opposite sides of a road will have broadly divergent tax and appraisal values. For example, on Rock Creek Road in Jones County, riverfront lots on the Trent River had a tax value of $201,286 per acre; lots immediately across the road had a tax value of $33,634 per acre, according to the Jones County GIS maps.

The developers and tourism promoters have broadly defined the Inner Banks as an area on the East Coast of North Carolina that is 22,227 square miles (57,568 km2). The so-called Inner Banks comprises over 3,000 miles of inland coastline and is home to over 2.5 million residents.  Marketing people include the Crystal Coast and Albemarle regions of the state in the Inner Banks. Having a moderate climate, the area is becoming a popular destination for retirees and small business entrepreneurs. "Inner Banks" is sometimes abbreviated with the acronym IBX, another attempt at trendiness.

The general definition states that the Inner Banks is a region between Interstate 95 to the west, the Outer Banks to the east, and extend from the Virginia border to the South Carolina border. Consisting of 41 counties, the region is three times the size of the state of New Jersey. Many areas farther from the sounds and tidal rivers have not embraced the Inner Banks brand and are seldom included in the definition.  Traditionally dependent on agriculture and the textile industry, eastern North Carolina has worked to redefine the region's strengths to transition into the new global economy.

Six small towns in the Inner Banks have joined in what they call the Creative Communities Initiative. They are working to foster an environment attractive to knowledge workers, artists, and other people working in the creative economy.  These six towns are: Ayden, Edenton, Hertford, Murfreesboro, Plymouth, and Tarboro.

Albemarle Region
Northeastern North Carolina (or the Albemarle Region) consists of 16 counties in extreme northeast North Carolina that surround Albemarle Sound and its tributaries, such as the Chowan and the Roanoke rivers. It has numerous attractions in terms of its undeveloped beaches, rivers, and small towns. Historic sites within the Albemarle Region are identified along the Historic Albemarle Tour.

History 
This waterway-rich region was inhabited for thousands of years by various cultures of indigenous peoples. By the historic period of European contact, the coastal area was occupied primarily by Algonquian-speaking tribes. The other two major language families of historic tribes in the state were Siouan languages and Iroquoian languages.

After European contact, the area which is now northeastern North Carolina and southeastern Virginia was one of the first in North America to be settled by English and related northern Europeans. Virginia Dare was born on nearby Roanoke Island in 1587, in what is today part of North Carolina. She is recorded as the first English child born in North America. The Roanoke colony did not survive.

From the 17th century through the antebellum era, the cash crops were tobacco and cotton, both of which were labor-intensive in cultivation and processing. Major planters imported thousands of enslaved Africans for their work force through 1808, when the Atlantic trade was prohibited by Congress. They and their descendants were integral to the survival and success of the North Carolina colony and later state. Tobacco was especially labor-intensive and exhausted the soil. Some of the first tobacco planters shifted to mixed farming by the end of the 18th century to restore their soils.

Most of the region was relatively prosperous for white planters until the American Civil War. The productive farmland and shipping industries became a frequent target for Union invasions. Several towns in the region were burned to the ground by Union troops during this time, including Plymouth and Winton. Confederate forces at Plymouth made the first use of an ironclad warship, the CSS Albemarle.

After the war, the region was slow to change its economy. The area continued to rely on agriculture for its main economic base, which suffered a decline through the end of the 19th century.

Area

Counties

The following is a list of counties usually considered a part of the Inner Banks (listed alphabetically):

Generally:

 Beaufort County
 Bertie County
 Camden County
 Carteret County
 Chowan County
 Craven County
 mainland Currituck County
 mainland Dare County
 eastern Edgecombe County
 Gates County
 eastern Halifax
 Hertford County
 mainland Hyde County
 eastern Jones County
 Martin County
 Northampton County
 eastern Onslow County
 Pamlico County
 Pasquotank County
 Perquimans County
 Pitt County
 Tyrrell County
 Washington County
 Wayne County

Cities and towns
The following is a list of some of the towns and communities in the Inner Banks (listed alphabetically):

Ahoskie
Ayden
Arapahoe
Aurora
Bath
Bayboro
Beaufort
Belhaven
Bethel
Camden
Chocowinity
Columbia
Corapeake
Creswell
Currituck
Edenton
Elizabeth City
Eure
Eureka
Farmville
Fremont
Gates
Gatesville
Greenville
Goldsboro
Grifton
Hampstead
Harkers Island
Havelock
Hertford
Hobbsville
Jacksonville
Knotts Island
Morehead City
Moyock
Murfreesboro
New Bern
Newport
Oak City
Oriental
Pantego
Plymouth
Robersonville
Roducco
Roper
Stantonsburg
Sunbury
Swan Quarter
Swansboro
Tarboro
Trenton
Vanceboro
Washington
Williamston
Windsor
Winfall
Winterville
Winton

Parks

Dismal Swamp State Park
Goose Creek State Park
Merchants Millpond State Park
Pettigrew State Park

Wildlife refuges
Alligator River National Wildlife Refuge
Cedar Island National Wildlife Refuge
Great Dismal Swamp National Wildlife Refuge
Mattamuskeet National Wildlife Refuge
Pocosin Lakes National Wildlife Refuge
Roanoke River National Wildlife Refuge
Swanquarter National Wildlife Refuge

Colleges and universities

Chowan University
East Carolina University
Elizabeth City State University
Mid-Atlantic Christian University
Beaufort County Community College
Carteret Community College
Coastal Carolina Community College
College of the Albemarle
Craven Community College
Edgecombe Community College
Halifax Community College
Martin Community College
Pamlico Community College
Pitt Community College
Roanoke-Chowan Community College

See also
Atlantic Coastal Plain
Crystal Coast
Down East
Intracoastal Waterway
Outer Banks
Southeastern North Carolina
Tidewater region

References

External links

Inner Banks
The IBX Newsletter
IBX Lifestyles
IBX Arts, a not-for-profit art organization, based in Columbia, NC
Cruising Carolina
Inner Banks Film

 Education
East Carolina University
Elizabeth City State University

 Municipalities and tourism
City of Greenville
Elizabeth City Area Convention & Visitors Bureau
Elizabeth City Area CVB's Blog
Inner Banks of Washington NC Tourism
Town of Belhaven
 Columbia, NC
 SwanQuarter, NC

 Museums
Museum of the Albemarle
Port O'Plymouth History Museum

Albemarle Region
Northeast North Carolina
North Carolina's Northeast

Eastern North Carolina
Regions of North Carolina